Ameurfina Melencio-Herrera (born Ameurfina Aguinaldo Melencio; 11 May 1922 – 12 October 2020) was a Filipino lawyer who served as an Associate Justice of the Philippine Supreme Court from 1979 to 1992. She was the second woman appointed to the Supreme Court, filling the vacancy left by the retirement of the first female Supreme Court Justice, Cecilia Muñoz-Palma.

Personal life

Born in Cabanatuan, Nueva Ecija to Jose P. and Carmen (née Aguinaldo) Melencio, Herrera was a granddaughter of Emilio Aguinaldo, the first President of the Philippines. Among the future Justice's baptismal godfathers was Supreme Court justice George A. Malcolm, who also happened to be the founder of the law school she would later attend, the University of the Philippines College of Law.

Melencio-Herrera died on 12 October 2020 at the age of 98.

Early career

Herrera studied law at the University of the Philippines and graduated cum laude in 1947. She topped the 1947 Philippine Bar Examinations with a 93.85% bar rating. She has attained the highest rating for all women bar examinees in Philippine Bar history. After a brief stint with a New York City law firm, Herrera engaged in private practice for several years until she was appointed to the judiciary. From 1962 to 1973, Herrera served as a trial court judge assigned in Quezon Province, then the City of Manila. She was appointed to the Court of Appeals in 1973.

Supreme Court

Herrera was elevated to the Supreme Court by President Ferdinand Marcos in 1979. When Corazon Aquino assumed the presidency following the 1986 EDSA Revolution, the incumbent members of the Supreme Court, all of whom were Marcos appointees, were asked to resign. Herrera, along with Claudio Teehankee Sr., Vicente Abad Santos, Nestor Alampay, and Hugo Gutierrez Jr. were the only incumbent justices who retained their seats on the bench. Aquino, however, opted to extend new appointments to these justices in lieu of extending their previous appointment by Marcos. Prior to re-appointing Herrera, Alampay and Gutierrez Jr. on 16 April 1986, Aquino appointed three new members to the Supreme Court, Jose Feria, Marcelo Fernan and Andres Narvasa. As a result, Herrera, Alampay and Gutierrez Jr. were supplanted in seniority by the Aquino appointees.

When Chief Justice Marcelo Fernan resigned in 1992 to run for the vice-presidency, Herrera was widely regarded as a leading contender to replace him. Because she was overtaken in seniority by Narvasa after the 1986 reorganization, however, it was Narvasa who was named Chief Justice, although Herrera had served on the Court longer.

Herrera retired in May 1992, and was named as the Chancellor of the Philippine Judicial Academy upon its inception in 1996. The academy is tasked with the professional training of members of the Philippines judiciary. Herrera served as Chancellor until May 2009.

References

 
 Supreme Court E-library: The Memorabilia Room; accessed 27 April 2015.

Notes

1922 births
2020 deaths
Associate Justices of the Supreme Court of the Philippines
Filipino women lawyers
University of the Philippines alumni
Aguinaldo family
People from Cabanatuan
Justices of the Court of Appeals of the Philippines
Filipino women judges
20th-century women judges